Byron Darwin Camacho Bautista (born May 24, 1988) is an Ecuadorian footballer currently playing for River Ecuador. He is a midfielder who was part of the squad who won the 2008 Copa Libertadores with LDU Quito.

External links
Camacho's FEF player card 

1988 births
Living people
People from Quinindé Canton
Association football midfielders
Ecuadorian footballers
L.D.U. Quito footballers
S.D. Aucas footballers
C.D. Técnico Universitario footballers
Mushuc Runa S.C. footballers
L.D.U. Portoviejo footballers
Guayaquil City F.C. footballers
Manta F.C. footballers